In Greek mythology, Philammon (Ancient Greek: Φιλάμμων) was an excellent musician, a talent he received from his father Apollo.

Family 
Philammon's mother was either Chione (or Philonis), daughter of Daedalion, or Leuconoe, daughter of Eosphoros. By Argiope, a nymph of Mount Parnassos, he had Thamyris.

Mythology 
Philammon was unnaturally beautiful and thus, one of the nymphs (Argiope) seduced the youth and became pregnant. But Philammon refused to take her into his house as his wife and for being ashamed of the pregnancy, the girl left Peloponnese and came to the Akte (shore) where she gave birth to a boy, Thamyris.

Philammon was said to have established the tradition of the hymns celebrating the births of Artemis and Apollo, written by himself, being performed by choruses of girls at Delphi. He was the second winner of the most ancient singing contest at Delphi, after Chrysothemis and before his son Thamyris. Some ascribe to him the foundation of the Lernaean mysteries. He was also reported to have been among the Argonauts.

Notes

References 

 Conon, Fifty Narrations, surviving as one-paragraph summaries in the Bibliotheca (Library) of Photius, Patriarch of Constantinople translated from the Greek by Brady Kiesling. Online version at the Topos Text Project.
 Gaius Julius Hyginus, Fabulae from The Myths of Hyginus translated and edited by Mary Grant. University of Kansas Publications in Humanistic Studies. Online version at the Topos Text Project.
 Pausanias, Description of Greece with an English Translation by W.H.S. Jones, Litt.D., and H.A. Ormerod, M.A., in 4 Volumes. Cambridge, MA, Harvard University Press; London, William Heinemann Ltd. 1918. . Online version at the Perseus Digital Library
 Pausanias, Graeciae Descriptio. 3 vols. Leipzig, Teubner. 1903.  Greek text available at the Perseus Digital Library.
 Pseudo-Apollodorus, The Library with an English Translation by Sir James George Frazer, F.B.A., F.R.S. in 2 Volumes, Cambridge, MA, Harvard University Press; London, William Heinemann Ltd. 1921. . Online version at the Perseus Digital Library. Greek text available from the same website.
 Publius Ovidius Naso, Metamorphoses translated by Brookes More (1859-1942). Boston, Cornhill Publishing Co. 1922. Online version at the Perseus Digital Library.
 Publius Ovidius Naso, Metamorphoses. Hugo Magnus. Gotha (Germany). Friedr. Andr. Perthes. 1892. Latin text available at the Perseus Digital Library.

Children of Apollo
Demigods in classical mythology